Dali & Cocky Prince is a 2021 South Korean television series starring Kim Min-jae, Park Gyu-young, Kwon Yul, Hwang Hee, and Yeonwoo. It is about the romance between a parvenu who lacks education, and the daughter of a prestigious family who tries to save a collapsed art museum. It aired on KBS2 from September 22 to November 11, 2021.

Synopsis
Visiting researcher Kim Dali meets restaurateur Jin Moo-hak in a case of mistaken identity in the Netherlands. When her father dies, Dali returns home to take over management of her family's struggling art museum. Moo-hak is a major creditor to the art museum, and they meet again unexpectedly when he arrives to collect on his debts. Gradually, Moo-hak realizes that he wants to turn the museum's fortunes around to help Dali rather than solely get his money back.

Cast

Main
 Kim Min-jae as Jin Moo-hak, the director of Dondon F&B, a company that started as a small gamja-tang restaurant and has grown into a global food service company with more than 400 franchise stores. He has natural sense of talking skills, trade and money.
 Park Gyu-young as Kim Dali, a visiting researcher at Saint Müller Museum and later becomes the director of Cheong-song Art Museum. She is well-versed in various fields, fluent in seven languages and has good personality, but lacks of skills in household chores like cooking.
 Kwon Yul as Jang Tae-jin, Dali's first love who is the head of Century Group's planning and coordination team.
 Hwang Hee as Joo Won-tak, a detective from the violent crime squad who was supported by Dali's father.
 Yeonwoo as Ahn Chak-hee, a gallerist and the daughter of a National Assembly member.

Supporting

People in the art museum
 Jang Gwang as Kim Nak-cheon, Dali's father who is the director of Cheong-song Art Museum.
 Woo Hee-jin as Song Sa-bong, a curator at Cheong-song Art Museum.
 Ahn Se-ha as Han Byung-se, an elite curator at Cheong-song Art Museum.
  as Hwang Gi-dong, facility management department engineer.
  as Na Gong-joo, an intern at the art museum.
 Lee Jae-woo as Kim Si-hyung, Nak-cheon's nephew.

People around Moo-hak
 Ahn Gil-kang as Jin Baek-won, Moo-hak's father who is the chairman of Dondon F&B.
 Seo Jeong-yeon as So Geum-ja, Moo-hak's stepmother and Baek-won's wife.
  as Jin Ki-cheol, Moo-hak's stepbrother and the head of Dondon F&B's planning department.
 Hwang Bo-ra as Yeo Mi-ri, Moo-hak's secretary.

Special appearances
 
 Hong Seok-cheon as Chef Hong Seok-cheon ( 1)
 Park Sang-myun as Ahn Sang-tae

Production
 The male lead role was first offered to actor Lee Jae-wook.
 Filming was scheduled to begin in April 2021. The series was originally scheduled to be aired in November and December 2021, but KBS finally decided to premiere it earlier.

Viewership

Notes

References

External links
  
 
 
 

Korean-language television shows
2021 South Korean television series debuts
2021 South Korean television series endings
Korean Broadcasting System television dramas
South Korean romantic comedy television series
Television series by Monster Union